The B.F. Jones Memorial Library is a historic library in Aliquippa, a city in Beaver County, Pennsylvania, United States.  Named for steel tycoon Benjamin Franklin Jones, it was built in 1927 with money donated by Jones' daughter.  As a product of the profits of the Jones and Laughlin Steel Company, for which Aliquippa was a company town, it resembled a Carnegie library.

Rated a high-quality example of small-scale Renaissance Revival architecture, the two-story library is built primarily of Indiana Limestone with a bronze roof.  Among its leading features are multiple plaster casts, windows of stained glass, carvings in imitation of those made by Italian sculptor Andrea della Robbia, and a large statue of Jones.

In 1978, the library was added to the National Register of Historic Places for its architecture and for its association with Jones in the development of Aliquippa.  The library continues in operation to the present day.

References

External links
Library website

Library buildings completed in 1927
Libraries on the National Register of Historic Places in Pennsylvania
Libraries established in 1927
Public libraries in Pennsylvania
Renaissance Revival architecture in Pennsylvania
Buildings and structures in Beaver County, Pennsylvania
Tourist attractions in Beaver County, Pennsylvania
National Register of Historic Places in Beaver County, Pennsylvania
Aliquippa, Pennsylvania
1927 establishments in Pennsylvania